Zaimoğlu is a Turkish surname. Notable people with the surname include:

 Belhe Zaimoğlu (born 1968), Turkish-German actress
 Feridun Zaimoğlu (born 1964), Turkish author and visual artist

Turkish-language surnames